Thrimurthy is a 1975 Indian Kannada-language thriller film, directed by C. V. Rajendran and produced by Parvathamma Rajkumar and S. P. Nagamma. The film stars Rajkumar, Jayamala, R. Sampath, Balakrishna and Vajramuni. Rajkumar plays 3 different roles in the film- A police inspector Vijay, a hippie vagabond Shekhar, Servant Sheshagiri and the main protagonist Sridhar.The film has musical score by G. K. Venkatesh. The movie was the debut movie of Tamil director C. V. Rajendran in Kannada. The film is divided into 3 stories –  Thrimurthy, Undoo Hoda Kondoo Hoda and Aalaagaballava Arasaagaballa. The movie was Parvathamma's first production venture under  Poornima Enterprises banner. It was also her maiden distribution venture. The movie was a huge success.

Plot

Thrimurthy
When the latter refuses, Mahadevayya threatens him of dire consequences. On the same day, Rajaram's nephew, Shrikanth threatens to destroy his life if he doesn't conduct his marriage with Prema in a week's time. After the party ends, a dispirited Rajaram receives a phone call from an anonymous caller, who threatens to provide  within a week's time in exchange for prema's life. While discussing about these incidents, the family receives a surprise in the form of CID Inspector Vijay, who claims to have been sent to solve the mystery and volunteers to stay in the home with an different identity to catch the culprit, where he develops a liking for Prema and soon they fall in love with each other. When Rajaram receives a few more such threatening phone calls, Vijay reveals that the prime suspects are Mahadevayya, Shrikanth and Rajaram's servant (who was caught handing over money to a notorious thug). On the night when Rajaram is to give the ransom, Vijay asks the family to lock themselves in a bedroom and only come out the next morning. The next morning they come out to see the servant tied up. They find a notice from Vijay, who reveals that he was responsible for the confusion and that he has fled with some important documents.

Undoo Hoda Kondoo Hoda 
Seetharam's wife is impressed by Shekhar, who in turn decides to choose him as a groom for her only daughter Bhaama, who however loves a professor from Mysore. Shekhar, who learns this fact asks her to consider him as his older brother and vows to conduct her marriage with her lover. He further persuades her to take him to Mysore the next day itself. The next day, Bhaama picks up Shekhar, whose behaviour changes on the way. Learning from a previous incident that Bhaama has developed an immense fear for knives, he uses one to make her unconscious and kidnaps her.

Aalaagaballava Arasaagaballa 
Sridhar, the elder son of a widowed landlord, runs away from his native after being harshly punished by his father causing the landlored to remarry to ensure maternal affection for his younger son, Giridhar. Years later, Sridhar returns from Delhi as an arrogant and spoilt young man who has no respect for fellow human beings and considers his step-mother, Savitri, as his nemesis much to the anger of Giridhar  who loves her. Sridhar wishes to get his share of property which ends in minor disputes between the brothers. During one such dispute, Sridhar is stabbed to death and Giridhar is arrested since the knife had his fingerprints. Despite his pleas, the court refuses to believe him and awards him death sentence. Deeply affected by the turn of events Savitri relocates to the house of her husband's friend in Bangalore where she runs across its caretaker, Seshgiri, who happens to be an old servant of her husband. After receiving a trunk call from her lawyer, they travel to the nearby private hospital and gets to know that Giridhar got a mild stroke the day before. She explains the things to Seshgiri. The next day they receive a letter from a woman named Rani who addresses herself as the wife of Sridhar who is unaware of her husband's death. After revealing the news of her husband's death, Savitri decides to transfer the wealth to her name. However, when they go for a walk the next day a man from Mercara recognises Rani as Shakuntala. 

Despite her claims of it being a case of mistaken identity, Seshgiri smells something fishy and asks her to bring her elder brother who resides in Mercara to prove her identity. Savitri's brother happens to be Seetharam who is upset over his daughter's disappearance. He is surprised to know that the woman claiming to be Rani is indeed Shakuntala, whom he had molested a few years back but doesn't reveal the truth after she secretly informs Seetharam that his daughter, Bhaama is under her custody. The next day, after collecting the address of Bhaama's residence, Seetharam travels to that house only to meet Shekhar. Suddenly, Bhaama appears from a room refusing to go with him since she believes he has some role in the death of Sridhar. In a flashback it is revealed that someone threw a knife at Sridhar thereby killing him which was supervised by Seetharam from a safe distance. The entire incidents were witnessed by Bhaama causing her to develop fear for knives. Coming to the present, Shekhar sends him back after mentioning about how he also knows about Seetharam's elder brother's involvement in the murder. Upon returning to his house he finds that Seshgiri has similarity to Shekhar and suspects his identity. He immediately phones his elder brother and asks him to come to sort out the confusion. The elder brother who arrives the next day itself happens to be Rajaram, who is shocked at the similarity that Seshgiri has to Vijay. He decides to bring Prema to crack the identity of Seshgiri. 

When the plan fails, the brothers decide to hire a group of goons to kidnap Rani only for them to wrongly kidnap Prema. Rajaram soon receives an anonymous phone call informing him of his daughter's location and goes there with Shrikant and a few goons. There they are greeted by Vijay, who subdues the goons while Prema bursts out to her father for his involvement in Sridhar's murder. Vijay reveals that he is in charge of Sridhar's case and threatens to expose his identity before everyone. Returning to his house, Rajaram asks Seetharam to raid Seshgiri's room from which they get cementing proofs to confirm that Vijay, Shekhar and Seshgiri are just three roles played by a single person. They assign Shrikant to murder him. The next day when Seshgiri escorts Savitri to the temple they are attacked. Seshgiri manages to subdue them and takes her to the house where Rani, Bhaama and Prema secretly resides and in their presence he reveals that he is the real Sridhar. In a flashback it is revealed that while in Delhi, Sridhar came across a newspaper article about the arrest of Giridhar and Sridhar's murder forcing him to return to Bangalore where he unsuccessfully convinces Giridhar of the reality.
Feeling suspicious about Rajaram, Sridhar poses as Vijay and raids his house from where he receives a letter mentioning about the fake Sridhar/Kamalakar. 

Further investigation takes him to Kamalakar's sister's house in Mercara. Shakuntala, who happens to be the sister of Kamalakar reveals that her brother was paid to act like a millionaire. She also recognises Seetharam as the person who molested her from a photo which Sridhar shows her. A further slip of the tongue by Seetharam in a later incident confirmed Sridhar's suspicion. Back to the present, Sridhar vows to bring the culprits before law so as to save his brother. He catches and subdues Shrikant, who reveals to the police about how they (Rajaram, Seetharam and Shrikant) had plotted to bring a person as Sridhar, murder him and frame Giridhar so as to usurp the entire wealth. The court punishes the criminals while Giridhar is released and unites with his family.

Cast

Rajkumar – Sridhar/Vijay/Shekhar/Sheshagiri
Jayamala- Prema 
R. Sampath – Rajaram
Vajramuni – Shrikanth
Shani Mahadevappa
Bheema Rao
Mahadevappa
Indiradevi
Pushpa
T. N. Balakrishna – Seetharam
Joker Shyam
Mallesh
Srinivas
Sureka
M. N. Lakshmidevi
Thoogudeepa Srinivas- Sridhar/Kamalakar
Krishna
Thipatur Siddaramaiah
Siddalingappa
M. V. Rajamma
Muniraju
G. V. Sharada
Ramu

Soundtrack
The music was composed by G. K. Venkatesh.

References

External links
 
 

1975 films
1970s Kannada-language films
Films scored by G. K. Venkatesh
Films directed by C. V. Rajendran